Robert Abial "Red" Rolfe (October 17, 1908 – July 8, 1969) was an American third baseman, manager and front-office executive in Major League Baseball. A graduate of Phillips Exeter Academy, Rolfe also was an Ivy Leaguer: a graduate, then long-time athletic director of Dartmouth College, and (1943–46) baseball and basketball coach at Yale University. 

Rolfe was a native of Penacook, New Hampshire.

Playing career
While a student at Dartmouth, Rolfe spent the summer of 1930 playing for the Orleans town team in the Cape Cod Baseball League, where he was skippered by longtime major league player and manager Patsy Donovan.

During his major league playing career, Rolfe was the starting third baseman on the New York Yankees of the late 1930s. The "Bronx Bombers" of Lou Gehrig, Joe DiMaggio, Bill Dickey, Lefty Gomez and Red Ruffing won American League pennants from 1936–39 and took all four World Series in which they appeared, winning 16 games and losing only three in Fall Classic play over that span. Rolfe played 10 major league seasons, all with New York, batting .289 with 69 home runs and 497 runs batted in (RBIs) in 1,175 games. His finest season came in 1939, when he led the American League with 213 hits, 139 runs scored, and 46 doubles while hitting .329 with 14 home runs and 80 RBIs. He retired following the 1942 season.

College and MLB coach
After his four-year coaching stint at Yale, Rolfe coached the Toronto Huskies of the Basketball Association of America in 1946–1947 and returned to the Yankees as a coach. After the  season, Rolfe joined the Detroit Tigers as director of their farm system. But he returned to the field after only one season, when he succeeded Steve O'Neill as Tiger manager after the  campaign.

Manager of Detroit Tigers
In , Rolfe's first season as manager, the Tigers improved by nine games and returned to the first division. A fluke botched double play was the team's undoing. Late in September at Cleveland, the Indians had the bases loaded in the tenth inning with one out and the score tied. Visibility was poor because smoke from Canadian forest fires was blowing across Lake Erie. On an apparent 3-2-3 double-play grounder to first base, Detroit catcher Aaron Robinson thought he simply needed to touch home plate for a force play to retire the Indians baserunner charging in from third. But in the smoky conditions Robinson had not seen that a putout had already been made at first base, necessitating that the catcher tag the runner, not the plate, to record an out. Robinson mistakenly tagged the plate, the run counted and Cleveland won the game. It was the turning point in the pennant race, for the postwar Tigers, and for Rolfe's managerial career.

On July 5, he was fired and replaced by one of his pitchers, Fred Hutchinson. The 1952 club won only 50 games, losing 104 – the first time ever that the Tigers lost 100 or more games.

Dartmouth athletic director
Rolfe then returned to Dartmouth as the athletic director of his alma mater from 1954 to 1967. The college's baseball diamond is named in his honor. Rolfe died in Gilford, New Hampshire, in 1969 at age 60 of chronic kidney disease. He was buried in his birthplace of Penacook.

See also

List of Major League Baseball annual runs scored leaders
List of Major League Baseball annual doubles leaders
List of Major League Baseball annual triples leaders
List of Major League Baseball players who spent their entire career with one franchise

References

External links

 
Red Rolfe biography from Society for American Baseball Research (SABR)

1908 births
1969 deaths
Major League Baseball third basemen
Cape Cod Baseball League players (pre-modern era)
Dartmouth Big Green athletic directors
Dartmouth Big Green baseball players
Detroit Tigers managers
New York Yankees coaches
New York Yankees players
Orleans Firebirds players
Toronto Huskies coaches
Yale Bulldogs baseball coaches
Yale Bulldogs men's basketball coaches
Albany Senators players
Newark Bears (IL) players
American League All-Stars
People from Belknap County, New Hampshire
People from Concord, New Hampshire
Baseball players from New Hampshire
Basketball coaches from New Hampshire
Burials in New Hampshire
International League MVP award winners
Phillips Exeter Academy alumni